A proving ground (US) is an installation or reservation in which technology such as weapons, military tactics and automobile prototypes are experimented with or tested. Proving grounds can be operated by government bodies or civilian industries. They are distinct from military training areas which are run by the military and intended for the routine training and exercising of troops across the terrain.

Military and government

Germany
 Peenemünde Army Research Centre, WW2 guided missile and rocket development and testing centre

South Korea
 Anheung Proving Ground, Taean County
 Changwon Proving Ground, Changwon City
 Darakdae Proving Ground, Pocheon City

Russia/former Soviet Union
In Russia, a designated area is usually called a "polygon" (Полигон).
 Kapustin Yar, aerial weapons and rocket test range used by the North Caucasus Military District
 Totskoye range, test range in the Urals where nuclear tests were carried out in 1954
 YakutiaChallenge, winter test proving ground in Yakutia, Eastern Siberia

North America

United States
In the United States, there are several military facilities that have been explicitly designated as proving grounds.
Aberdeen Proving Ground, a United States Army facility in Aberdeen, Maryland. It is the Army's oldest active proving ground, established on October 20, 1917, six months after the United States entered World War I. It was created so that design and testing of ordnance materiel could be carried out in proximity to the nation's industrial and shipping centers at the time.
Dugway Proving Ground, an active facility operated by the United States Army Test and Evaluation Command in the Great Salt Lake Desert of Utah. Dugway's mission is to test U.S. and Allied biological and chemical weapon defense systems.
Fort Belvoir Proving Ground, in Fairfax County, Virginia
Indian Head Naval Surface Warfare Center, located in Indian Head, Maryland and at one time called the Indian Head Proving Ground
Jefferson Proving Ground, in Madison, Indiana. It was principally a munitions testing facility of Test and Evaluation Command of the United States Army Materiel Development and Readiness Command. The facility was ordered closed in 1989 as part of the Base Realignment and Closure (BRAC) process.
Pacific Proving Grounds, an inactive U.S. Department of Energy area in the Marshall Islands that were established by the U.S. Atomic Energy Commission in 1946 for nuclear weapons testing. It mainly consists of Bikini Atoll, Enewetak Atoll & the surrounding area, and was deactivated in 1963.
Sandy Hook Proving Ground, in Sandy Hook, New Jersey, was the nation's first such facility. It was created in 1874 and was used as a proving ground until 1919.
Scituate Proving Ground, a former proving ground in Scituate, Massachusetts, operational from 1918 to 1921
The proving ground is used for testing military equipment and encompasses 1,307.8 square miles (3,387.2 km²) in the Sonoran Desert.

Automotive

Automotive proving grounds or automotive test tracks serve the automotive industry for road vehicle testing. In the automotive development process, vehicle manufacturers typically test the behaviour of vehicles in various environments and traffic situations. Conventional vehicle testing usually focuses on the dynamic properties of vehicles. Test tracks generally encompass the engineering tasks of vehicle testing and validation.

With the advent of self-driving cars, new proving grounds specially dedicated for them have appeared, and existing conventional proving grounds have been retooled for the testing of highly automated or fully autonomous vehicles.

Automaker-owned
 Chrysler Proving Grounds
 Ford Proving Grounds
 General Motors Proving Grounds
 Hyundai Ulsan proving ground
 Hyundai Hwaseong proving ground
 Mazda Proving Grounds
 Nissan Proving Grounds
 Nardò Ring (Porsche)
 Ehra-Lessien test track (Volkswagen)

Independent
Source: 

 Applus+ IDIADA proving ground, Spain
 4activeSystems Test Track, Traboch, Austria. An all-in-one test track next to 4activeSystems' headquarters, an testing equipment manufacturer for ADAS and autonomous driving.
 Hwaseong Songsan proving ground, South Korea
 , Germany
 Bruntingthorpe Airfield & Proving Ground, United Kingdom
 Digitrans Automotive Proving Ground, St. Valentin, Austria
 HORIBA MIRA, United Kingdom
 Lang Lang Proving Ground, Australia
 GoMentum Station, United States
 Millbrook Proving Ground, United Kingdom
 Nevada Automotive Testing Center, United States
 Southern Hemisphere Proving Grounds, New Zealand
 TRIWO Automotive Testing Center, near Frankfurt and Saarbrücken, Germany
 UTAC, headquartered in Linas-Montlhéry France where it operates Autodrome de Linas-Montlhéry operational since 1924 the first of its eight proving grounds located in 10 countries. 
 ZalaZone Automotive Proving Ground, Hungary

Footnotes

Further reading

 Edwin A. Martini (ed.), Proving Grounds: Militarized Landscapes, Weapons Testing, and the Environmental Impact of US Bases. Seattle, WA: University of Washington Press, 2015.

External links
Finnish ordnance center at mil.fi (in Finnish)
YakutiaChallenge
Drawsko Pomorskie Training Area
Otterburn Training Area

Military installations